Ashiquzzaman (born 15 August 1991) is a Bangladeshi cricketer. He made his first-class debut for Khulna Division in the 2016–17 National Cricket League on 20 December 2016. On debut, he took 6 wickets for 57 runs in the second innings and nine wickets in the match, winning the man of the match award.

He made his List A debut for Legends of Rupganj in the 2017–18 Dhaka Premier Division Cricket League on 17 February 2018.

References

External links
 

1991 births
Living people
Bangladeshi cricketers
Khulna Division cricketers
Legends of Rupganj cricketers
People from Satkhira District